Ağaköy can refer to:

 Ağaköy, Biga
 Ağaköy, Ulus